Bara Imambara, also known as Asafi Imambara is an imambara complex in Lucknow, India built by Asaf-ud-Daula, Nawab of Awadh in 1784. Bara means big. This imambara is the second largest after the Nizamat Imambara.

Building composition

The building also includes the large Asfi mosque, the Bhul-bhulaiya (the labyrinth), and Bowli, a step well with running water. Two imposing gateways lead to the main hall. It is said that there are 1024 ways to reach the terrace but only two to come back first gate or the last gate. It is an accidental architecture.

Relief measure
Construction of Bara Imambara was started in 1780, a year of a devastating famine, and one of Asaf-ud-Daula's objectives in embarking on this grandiose project was to provide employment for people in the region for almost a decade while the famine lasted. It is said that ordinary people used to work in the day building up the edifice, while noblemen and other elite worked at night to break down anything that was raised that day. It was a project that preceded a Keynesian-like intervention for employment generation. Construction of the Imambara was completed in 1794. The estimated cost of building the Imambara ranges between half a million rupees to a million rupees. Even after completion, the Nawab used to spend between four and five hundred thousand rupees on its decoration annually.

Architecture

The architecture of the complex reflects the maturation of ornamented Mughal design, namely the Badshahi Mosque - it is one of the last major projects not incorporating any European elements or the use of iron. The main imambara consists of a large vaulted central chamber containing the tomb of Asaf-ud-Daula. At 50 by 16 meters and over 15 meters tall, it has no beams supporting the ceiling and is one of the largest such arched constructions in the world.  There are eight surrounding chambers built to different roof heights, permitting the space above these to be reconstructed as a three-dimensional labyrinth with passages interconnecting with each other through 489 identical doorways. This part of the building, and often the whole complex, may be referred to as the Bhulbhulaiya. Known as a popular attraction, it is possibly the only existing maze in India and came about unintentionally to support the weight of the building which is constructed on marshy land. Asaf-ud-Daula also erected the 18 meter (59 foot) high Roomi Darwaza, just outside. This portal, embellished with lavish decorations, was the Imambara's west-facing entrance. Bara Imambara is an Imambara complex in Lucknow, India, built byAsaf-ud-Daula, Nawab of Lucknow, in 1784. It is also called the Asafi Imambara. Bara means big, and an Imambara is a shrine built by Shia Muslims for the purpose of Azadari. The Bara Imambara is among the grandest buildings of Lucknow.

The design of the Imambara was obtained through a competitive process. The winner was a Delhi architect Kifayatullah, who also lies buried in the main hall of the Imambara. It is another unique aspect of the building that the sponsor and the architect lie buried beside each other. The roof of Imambara is made up from the rice husk ash which makes this Imambara a unique building.

See also
 Roomi Darwaza
 Chhatar Manzil
 Imambara Shah Najaf
 Chota Imambara
 Imambara Ghufran Ma'ab
 Imambaras of Lucknow

References

External links
 
 Bara Imambara more facts

Indo-Islamic architecture
Shia shrines
Shia Islam in India
Religious buildings and structures in Uttar Pradesh
Imambaras of Lucknow
Religious buildings and structures completed in 1784
1784 establishments in India